NGC 6539 (also GCL 85) is a globular cluster in the constellation Serpens. It was discovered by Theodor Brorsen in 1856.

References

External links

Globular clusters
Discoveries by Theodor Brorsen
Astronomical objects discovered in 1856
6539
Serpens (constellation)